Texas is a rural town and locality in the Goondiwindi Region, Queensland, Australia. It is on the border of Queensland and New South Wales.

Geography 
The town is located just  from Queensland's southern border with New South Wales, close to Bonshaw, New South Wales. The locality across the New South Wales border is also known as Texas, having a shared history as being part of the Texas pastoral run.

State Route 89, a road with two names, runs through the locality, entering from the east as Stanthorpe – Texas Road (Mingoola Road, Fleming Street and High Street in the town) and exiting to the north-west as Inglewood – Texas Road (Greenup Street).

Texas has the following mountains:

 Texas Mount 
 The Blacks Rock

Texas Aerodrome is on the Texas-Yelarbon Road, north-west of the town. The runway is approx  of graded gravel. It is operated by the Goondiwindi Regional Council.

History 
Bigambul (also known as Bigambal, Bigumbil, Pikambul, Pikumbul) is an Australian Aboriginal language spoken by the Bigambul people. The Bigambul language region includes the landscape within the local government boundaries of the Goondiwindi Regional Council, including the towns of Goondiwindi, Yelarbon and Texas extending north towards Moonie and Millmerran.

Texas sits on Bigambul land, the Indigenous people of the region who inhabited the area for thousands of years prior to colonisation in the 1840s.

Texas, at one time, relied on its importance of grazing. It was settled in 1842 and was named after the largest nearby landholding in the area, known as Texas Station.
 
The origin of the town's name is generally regarded as a reference to a territorial dispute.  The land in the area was first settled by the McDougall brothers, who found squatters there on returning from the goldfields. Once their legal right to the land was recognised, they named their property in honour of the dispute between the United States and Mexico over territory in Texas.

Texas Provisional School opened on 1 March 1887. On 1 January 1900, it became Texas State School.

Land in Texas was open for selection on 17 April 1877;  were available.

Texas was connected by the Texas railway line from Inglewood in November 1930 with the town being served by the Texas railway station. The line was closed in 1994, but officially remains operational. However, the station is officially abandoned.

Up until about 1986, tobacco farming was an important industry in the area and many Italian families settled the area to run and work the tobacco farms.  The tobacco industry had begun to be important in the late 1800s.  In the 1870s, Chinese workers began to be employed on the Texas Station to grow the crop for local use.  "They were employed because they had grown their own tobacco before, so you use somebody who can already grow something instead of reinventing the wheel," local historian Robyn Griffin explained.  "Smoking had become quite fashionable, and they would've also sold some of it to manufacturers." Later, during the 1900s, much of the region's tobacco was grown in the Dumaresq Valley beside the Dumaresq River.

The current Texas Library was opened in 2010 with minor refurbishment in 2011.

Economy 
Farming is the dominant industry in the Texas region, although there is also a silver mine. A large cattle feedlot is located about 20 min from town.

Part of the Goondiwindi Region, Texas is administered from the nearby larger town of Goondiwindi.

As of 2022, Texas is serviced by three petrol stations. A Shell Branded service station sells both regular and premium (greater than 95 octane) unleaded petrol. Similarly, a BP service station, providing regular and premium petrol. A Metro service station adds to competitive pricing, in addition all 3 provide convenience store items in varying degrees plus takeout food options. All 3 stations provide diesel fuel.

Education

Texas P-10 State School is a government primary and secondary (Early Childhood-10) school for boys and girls at 1 Flemming Street. In 2018, the school had an enrolment of 160 students with 16 teachers (15 full-time equivalent) and 16 non-teaching staff (9 full-time equivalent). It includes a special education program.

There are no schools offering education to Year 12 in or near Texas (the nearest being in Stanthorpe and Goondiwindi). Distance education and boarding schools are options.

Amenities 
Texas public library is at 46 High Street. It is operated by the Goondiwindi Regional Council.
Texas Memorial Hall is at 50 High Street. It is operated by the Goondiwindi Regional Council.

The Texas branch of the Queensland Country Women's Association has its rooms at 27 Broadway Street.

Texas has a swimming pool, bowling club, golf course, showground and a racecourse.

Attractions 
The Texas Heritage Centre and Tobacco Museum is at 50 Fleming Street.

Media 
Texas is serviced by the MacIntyre Gazette, Warwick Daily News and Stanthorpe Border Post newspapers. Texas is served by the Border Districts Community Radio Station 89.7 Ten FM which is transmitted from a 4 kW transmitter located on Mt Mackenzie Tenterfield NSW.

In popular culture

After a visit to Texas in 2002, and being involved in a car accident nearby, American Country/Rockabilly recording artist Jason Lee Wilson memorialised the town in a song TX, QLD, Australia.  The song was included on the Cumberland Runners' 2004 debut album entitled Music to Haul By.

Previously, James Blundell had written and recorded a song entitled Texas as the B-side of his first single on the EMI label (EMI 2165), Cloncurry Cattle Song. On the single the writing credits of the two songs were inadvertently switched, but corrected on Blundell's debut, self-titled album (1989). Texas was composed by James Blundell and Doug Trevor, with Blundell and M. Hickson writing Cloncurry Cattle Song.

Lee Kernaghan also referenced the town in his 2002 hit song Texas, Qld 4385 from his Electric Rodeo album released in 2002.

Notable people
 James Blundell - singer
 Travis Burns – Rugby League player
 Peter Hitchener – Nine News Melbourne Monday–Thursday presenter

Climate

References

External links

 
 

Towns in Queensland
Towns in the Darling Downs
Goondiwindi Region
Localities in Queensland
Australian places named after U.S. places or U.S. history